Apha is a genus of moths in the family Eupterotidae.

Species
 Apha aequalis (Felder, 1874)
 Apha arisana Matsumura, 1927
 Apha floralis Butler, 1881
 Apha horishana Matsumura, 1927
 Apha huabeiana Yang, 1978
 Apha kantonensis Mell, 1929
 Apha strix Bryk, 1944
 Apha subdives Walker, 1855

Former species
 Apha gonioptera West, 1932

References

Eupterotinae
Macrolepidoptera genera